Scaptius pseudoprumala is a moth in the family Erebidae. It was described by Walter Rothschild in 1935. It is found in the Brazilian state of Santa Catarina.

References

Moths described in 1935
Phaegopterina
Arctiinae of South America